Artur Augusto was a Portuguese footballer who played as a forward.

Artur Augusto played for the Portugal national football team in its inaugural match, a friendly against Spain in Madrid on 18 December 1921. He was the only player from the city of Porto included in the squad and became FC Porto's first international.

His brother, Alberto Augusto, was also a Portuguese international footballer.

References

External links
 
 

Portuguese footballers
Association football forwards
S.L. Benfica footballers
FC Porto players
Portugal international footballers
1896 births